The Stone Age is a period of human prehistory.

Stone Age may also refer to:

Music 
 Stone Age (album), a 1971 compilation album by The Rolling Stones
 Stoneage (Stone album), 1998
 "Stone Age!", a song by P-Model from the album P-Model

Film and television 
 "The Stone Age" (The Goodies), an episode of The Goodies
 The Stone Age (film), a 1989 TV movie featuring Carmen du Sautoy
 Stone Age Cartoons, a 1940 American series of 12 animated short films from Fleischer Studios

Other 
 Stone Age Institute, an archaeological research center
 Stone Age (board game), 2008
 Operation Stone Age, a convoy operation in World War II

See also 
 The Stoned Age, a 1994 American comedy film
 Queens of the Stone Age, an American rock band from Palm Desert, California